Amauroderma laccatostiptatum is a polypore fungus in the family Ganodermataceae. It was described as a new species in 2015 by mycologists Allyne Christina Gomes-Silva, Leif Ryvarden, and Tatiana Gibertoni. The specific epithet laccatostiptatum (from the Latin words laccatus = "appearing varnished" and stipitatum = "with a stipe") refers to the varnished stipe. A. laccatostiptatum is found in the states of Amazonas, Pará, and Rondônia in the Brazilian Amazon. The fungus fruits on soil.

References

laccatostiptatum
Fungi described in 2015
Fungi of Brazil
Taxa named by Leif Ryvarden